Nathan Marsh Pusey (April 4, 1907 – November 14, 2001) was an American academic. Originally from Council Bluffs, Iowa, Pusey won a scholarship to Harvard University out of high school and went on to earn bachelor's, master's, and doctorate degrees in the classics at Harvard. Pusey began his academic career as a professor of literature at Scripps College and Wesleyan University before serving as president of Lawrence College from 1944 to 1953.

Serving as President of Harvard University from 1953 to 1971, Pusey was the first president of Harvard from outside New England. After his time at Harvard, he was president of the Andrew W. Mellon Foundation from 1971 to 1975.

Early life and education
Pusey was born in Council Bluffs, Iowa to John and Rosa Pusey. His great uncle William Henry Mills Pusey had served as an Iowa state senator and member of the United States House of Representatives. He shared a name with another great uncle, Iowa state senator Nathan Marsh Pusey. The younger Pusey was educated at Harvard College (B.A.), and received M.A. (1928) and Ph.D (1937) degrees from Harvard University, studying English literature and ancient history. During his freshman year in college, he lived in Stoughton Hall.

He married Anne Woodward in 1936. The couple later had three children.

Educational career
Pusey's first teaching post after he graduated was at Riverdale Country School.  He then taught at Lawrence College, Scripps College, and Wesleyan University. He served as president of Lawrence College (1944–1953), and later as the 24th president of Harvard University (1953–1971).

During his presidency of Harvard, Pusey overhauled the admissions process, which had been biased heavily in favor of the alumni of New England-based boarding schools, and began admitting public school graduates based on scores obtained on standardized tests such as the SAT. This was highly controversial with the school's alumni population but set the stage for diversifying the student body and faculty.

Political positions
Pusey was a devout, lifelong Episcopalian who deplored the “almost idolatrous” secularism of his era.  He was an active member of All Saints Episcopal Church in Appleton, Wisconsin, during his presidency of Lawrence College.

Pusey vigorously opposed McCarthyism in the 1950s and supported the US Civil Rights Movement in the 1960s. His clashes with Joseph McCarthy were especially significant because Pusey's position at Lawrence College placed him in the senator's hometown (Appleton, Wisconsin) and amid the political power base of the then-conservative Fox Valley. As president of the college, Pusey held the community's respect, and his vocal criticisms of McCarthy resounded loudly in the area. Pusey was a deeply religious man and a somewhat traditionalist scholar, and he was appalled by the student radicalism that raged in American universities in the late 1960s.  

He complained bitterly that "learning has almost ceased" in many universities because of the violent, revolutionary activities of a "small group of overeager young... who feel they have a special calling to redeem society."  In April 1969, student activists occupied Harvard's University Hall (the building that housed most of the administrative offices) in protest over the presence of ROTC on campus at the height of the Vietnam War. In response, Pusey summoned the police to arrest the demonstrators. Although his action was legal, it was widely criticized, and the resulting furor probably contributed to his early retirement in 1971. After his time at Harvard, Pusey was president of the Andrew W. Mellon Foundation (1971–1975) and president of the United Board for Christian Higher Education in Asia (1979–1980).

Published works
 The Age of the Scholar, 1963
 American Higher Education 1945-1970: A Personal Report, 1978

Notes

External links
 Biography at Lawrence University
 Obituary in the Harvard Crimson
 Obituary in the Harvard Gazette

1907 births
2001 deaths
People from Council Bluffs, Iowa
Wesleyan University faculty
Presidents of Harvard University
Presidents of Lawrence University
Andrew W. Mellon Foundation
Harvard College alumni
Schoolteachers from Iowa
Scripps College faculty
Schoolteachers from New York (state)
20th-century American educators